Ghayl is the name of a suburb of Kalba in Sharjah, United Arab Emirates (UAE), and home to Ghayl Fort and the Kalba Birds of Prey Centre.

References

Populated places in the Emirate of Sharjah